Parsnip is an Australian rock band. They released their debut album, When the Tree Bears Fruit in 2019 with the line-up of Carolyn Hawkins on drums, Stella Rennex on guitar and vocals, Paris Richenson bass guitar and vocals and Rebecca Liston on keyboards.

History 

Parsnip formed in early 2016 in Melbourne after meeting at Geelong's Jerkfest. Initial line-up was Sequoia Harris (of the Clits) on organ, Carolyn Hawkins on drums (from Melbourne), Paris Richens on bass guitar and vocals (from Geelong), and Stella Rennex on guitar and vocals (from Sydney). Harris of The Clits was replaced by Rebecca Liston on keyboards.

They were all friends prior to forming Parsnip, and spent their first year together playing almost every week before recording their debut self-titled EP. Before joining the band, Rennex had played saxophone since she was eight and later studied music in high school. Liston and Hawkins also studied music, while Richens was the only member without any formal musical training.

After their debut album, When the Tree Bears Fruit was released on Anti Fade Records in 2019, Parsnip toured the United States. In 2022 the band played as part of Homecoming, a tour that returns musicians to perform in their hometowns after the lockdowns of the COVID-19 pandemic.

Members 

 Sequoia Harris – organ 
 Carolyn Hawkins – drums 
 Stella Rennex – guitar, vocals 
 Paris Richens – bass guitar, vocals 
 Rebecca Liston – keyboards

Discography

Extended plays 

 Parsnip, late 2017
 Feeling Small, 2018
 Adding Up, 2020

Albums 
 When the Tree Bears Fruit, 2019

References

External links 

Australian rock music groups
Musical groups from Geelong
Musical groups established in 2016
Anti Fade Records artists